is a Japanese 3DCG-focused animation studio founded on May 14, 2014 in Mitaka, Tokyo.

Works

Television series

Original video animations

References

External links

  
 

 
Animation studios in Tokyo
Japanese animation studios
Japanese companies established in 2014
Mass media companies established in 2014
Mitaka, Tokyo